Sake Dean Mahomed (1759–1851) was a Bengali traveller, surgeon, entrepreneur, and one of the most notable early non-European immigrants to the Western World. Due to non-standard transliteration, his name is often spelled in various ways. His high social status meant that he later adopted the honorific "Sake" meaning "venerable one". Mahomed introduced Indian cuisine and shampoo baths to Europe, where he offered therapeutic massage. He was also the first Indian to publish a book in English.

Early life

Born in  May 1759 in the city of Patna, then part of the Bengal Subah of the Mughal Empire, he was from a Bengali Muslim family. He claimed to be related to the Nawabs of Bengal, and that he had ancestors who worked in administrative service under the Mughal Emperors. Sake Dean Mahomed grew up in Patna. His father served in the East India Company's Bengal Army and died in battle when Mahomed was about 11 years old. Following his father's death, he was taken under the wing of Captain Godfrey Evan Baker, an Anglo-Irish Protestant officer. Mahomed served in the army of the East India Company as a trainee surgeon and against the Marathas. He remained with Captain Baker until 1782, when the Captain resigned. That same year, Mahomed also resigned from the Army, choosing to accompany Baker, 'his best friend', to Ireland.

Adult life and family
In 1784, Mahomed emigrated to Cork, Ireland, with the Baker family. There he studied to improve his English language skills at a local school, and fell in love with Jane Daly, a "pretty Irish girl of respectable parentage". The Daly family was opposed to their relationship because it was illegal for Protestants to marry non-Protestants at the time, so the couple eloped to another town to get married. Mahomed and Daly were married in the Diocese of Cork & Ross in Cork. They moved to 7 Little Ryder Street in London, England, at the turn of the 19th century." In 1786, Mahomed converted from Islam to Christianity. 
 
According to leading scholars, and as indicated by parish records in London, Mahomed contracted a bigamous marriage in Marylebone in 1806 to Jane Jeffreys (1780-1850); the banns were read on 24 August for Jane and "William Mahomet." He had a daughter, Amelia (b. 1808) by her and is listed as the father "William Dean Mahomet" in the parish register. Amelia was baptised on 11 June 1809 at St Marylebone, Westminster, in London. By his legal wife, Sake Dean Mahomed had seven children: Rosanna, Henry, Horatio, Frederick, Arthur, and Dean Mahomed (baptised in the Roman Catholic church of St. Finbarr's, Cork, in 1791).

His son, Frederick, was a proprietor of Turkish baths at Brighton and also ran a boxing and fencing academy near Brighton. His most famous grandson, Frederick Henry Horatio Akbar Mahomed (c. 1849–1884), became an internationally known physician and worked at Guy's Hospital in London. He made important contributions to the study of high blood pressure. Another of Sake Dean Mahomed's grandsons, Rev. James Keriman Mahomed, was appointed as the vicar of Hove, Sussex, in the late 19th century. James married Emma Louisa Black, a flower painter whose work was displayed at the Royal Academy. Together they had a son, RAF Captain Felix Wyatt. Felix was killed in action during the First World War after he was shot down whilst flying over France. During the war, Frederick and James' children changed their surnames from Mahomed to Deane and Wyatt, respectively, in order to avoid xenophobic attention at a time when racial prejudice was rife and mixed marriages were disapproved of.

The Travels of Dean Mahomet

On 15 January 1794, Mahomed published a book titled The Travels of Dean Mahomet. The book is in epistolary form as was common for travel books and many novels in that era and consists of 38 letters. The book begins with a brief introduction where he contrasts Ireland and India, writing that "the face of every thing about me [is] so contrasted to those striking scenes in India." and proceeds to give a sketch of his early years. He then describes his travels over the period 1770 to 1775 as a camp follower to the Bengal army as it moved around North East India.  A series of military conflicts  are described along with descriptions of some major cities, including Kolkata (Calcutta) and Varanasi (Benares). This is accompanied by first hand accounts of Indian culture, trade, military conflicts, food, wildlife, etc.  The book concludes with a description of Mahomed's voyage to Britain where he arrived at Dartmouth in September 1784. While Mahomed gives an insightful and sympathetic account of India and Indian customs, as Mona Narain points out this is done from an essentially European cultural perspective - he consistently uses the pronoun "we" to describe himself and Europeans, and does not in his writings seek to challenge poor governmental management within the East India Company. The historian Michael Fisher, who published a biographical essay to accompany an edition of the book, suggested that some passages in the book were closely paraphrased from other travel narratives written in the late 18th century.

Restaurant venture

In 1810, after moving to London, Sake Dean Mahomed opened the first Indian restaurant in England: the Hindoostane Coffee House in George Street, near Portman Square, Central London. The restaurant offered, among other items, hookah "with real chilm tobacco, and Indian dishes, ... allowed by the greatest epicures to be unequalled to any curries ever made in England." The restaurant also provided a home delivery service. This venture came to an end in 1812 due to financial difficulties.

Introduction of shampooing to Europe
Before opening his restaurant, Mahomed had  worked in London for nabob Basil Cochrane, who had installed a steam bath for public use in his house in Portman Square and promoted its medical benefits. Once again indicating his acceptance by the wealthy elite, Mahomed and his family lived alongside the rich and titled in Portman Square and Mahomed may have been responsible for introducing the practice of "champi" or "shampooing" (or Indian massage) there. In 1814, Mahomed and his family moved back to Brighton and opened the first commercial "shampooing" vapour masseur bath in England, "Mahomed's Baths", on the site now occupied by the Queen's Hotel. Located on the seafront, the luxurious bathhouse offered therapeutic baths and shampooing with Indian oils. He described the treatment in a local paper as "The Indian Medicated Vapour Bath (type of Turkish bath), a cure to many diseases and giving full relief when every thing fails; particularly Rheumatic and paralytic, gout, stiff joints, old sprains, lame legs, aches and pains in the joints".
Jane Daly, Mahomed's wife, was also actively involved in the bathhouse business. Adverts suggested that, like her husband, Jane possessed "the art of shampooing" and that she superintended the Ladies Baths. The business was an immediate success and Dean Mahomed became known as "Dr. Brighton". Hospitals referred patients to him and he was appointed as shampooing surgeon to both King George IV and William IV. Due to a lack of capital, however, Mahomed's Baths was put up for auction in the late 1830s and Mahomed and his family were forced to relocate to more modest accommodation in Brighton.

The literary critic Muneeza Shamsie notes that Mahomed wrote two books connected to his burgeoning trade. The first was Cases Cured by Sake Deen Mahomed, Shampooing Surgeon, and Inventor of the Indian Medicated Vapour and Sea-Water Bath (1820), while the second, Shampooing; or, benefits resulting from the use of the Indian medicated vapour bath, went through three editions (1822, 1826, 1838) and was dedicated to King George IV. In this work, Mahomed speaks of the initial resistance to the idea of shampooing among the English he encountered in his new country: "It is not in the power of any individual to give unqualified satisfaction, or to attempt to establish a new opinion without the risk of incurring the ridicule, as well as censure, of some portion of mankind. So it was with me: in the face of indisputable evidence, I had to struggle with doubts and objections raised and circulated against my Bath, which, but for the repeated and numerous cures effected by it, would long since have shared the common fate of most innovations in science."

Death

Mahomed died on 24 February 1851 (aged 91–92) at 32 Grand Parade, Brighton. He was buried in a grave at St Nicholas Church, Brighton, in which his son Frederick was later interred.  Frederick taught fencing, gymnastics and other activities in Brighton at a gymnasium he built on the town's Church Street.

Recognition
After his death in 1851, Sake Dean Mahomed, once so renowned in Ireland and Brighton's social scenes, had begun to lose prominence as a public figure and until the scholarly interventions of the last fifty years was largely forgotten by history. The modern renewal of interest in his writings developed after poet and scholar Alamgir Hashmi drew attention to this author in the 1970s and 1980s. Michael H. Fisher has written a book on Sheikh Dean Mahomet entitled The First Indian Author in English: Dean Mahomed in India, Ireland, and England (Oxford University Press, Delhi, 1996). Additionally, Rozina Visram's Ayahs, Lascars and Princes: The Story of Indians in Britain 1700–1947 (1998) was highly influential in drawing public attention to Mahomed's life and work.

Several commemorations of and tributes to Mahomed's legacy have taken place in the 21st century. On 29 September 2005 the City of Westminster unveiled a Green Plaque commemorating the opening of the Hindoostane Coffee House. The plaque is at 102 George Street, close to the original site of the coffee house at 34 George Street. On 15 January 2019, Google recognised Sake Dean Mahomed with a Google Doodle on the main page.

See also
Lascar

Published works

References

Notes

Citations

Sources

External links

 Celebrating Sake Dean Mahomed at Google Doodle
 Web version of The Travels of Dean Mahomet
Works by or about Sake Dean Mahomed at Internet Archive
Works by or about Sake Dean Mahomed at HathiTrust
 
 "Making History – Sake Dean Mahomed – Regency 'Shampooing Surgeon'", BBC – Beyond the Broadcast
 Black History in Brighton
 
 Differences in Attitudes: Sheikh Deen Mahomed and Shampoo (Urdu)

1759 births
1851 deaths
18th-century Indian writers
19th-century Indian writers
18th-century Bengalis
19th-century Bengalis
British Anglicans
British former Muslims
British Indian history
British people of Bengali descent
Converts to Anglicanism from Islam
Indian Anglicans
Indian emigrants to England
Indian emigrants to Ireland
Indian former Muslims
Indian surgeons
Indian travel writers
Mughal Empire
Writers from Patna
British East India Company Army officers